Walter Angello Tandazo Silva (born 14 June 2000) is a Peruvian footballer who plays as a midfielder for FBC Melgar.

Career statistics

Club

Notes

References

2000 births
Living people
Peruvian footballers
Peru youth international footballers
Association football midfielders
Club Alianza Lima footballers
FBC Melgar footballers